is a Japanese athletics competitor competing in the high jump. In 2019, he competed in the men's high jump at the 2019 World Athletics Championships held in Doha, Qatar. He did not qualify to compete in the final.

References

External links

 

Living people
1994 births
Place of birth missing (living people)
Japanese male high jumpers
World Athletics Championships athletes for Japan